The Philippine Senate Committee on Public Information and Mass Media is a standing committee of the Senate of the Philippines.

Jurisdiction 
According to the Rules of the Senate, the committee handles all matters relating to:

 Public information, mass communication and broadcast services
 Implementation of the provisions of the Constitution regarding ownership and management of mass media and the advertising industry
 Development and promotion of information technology
 Artistic standards and quality of the motion picture and television industry
 The Movie and Television Review and Classification Board
 The Film Development Council of the Philippines
 The Presidential Communications Office

Members, 19th Congress 
Based on the Rules of the Senate, the Senate Committee on Public Information and Mass Media has 13 members.

The President Pro Tempore, the Majority Floor Leader, and the Minority Floor Leader are ex officio members.

Here are the members of the committee in the 19th Congress as of September 30, 2022:

Committee secretary:  Bernadine B. Mahinay

See also 

 List of Philippine Senate committees

References 

Public Information